Jhilmila Lake is a  large natural lake in Bhimdatta Municipality of Kanchanpur District in Nepal. Its basin area of  consists of marshes and meadows. It is surrounded by deciduous forest dominated by Sal, pine and rhododendron trees.

It is also a home for many aquatic animals, especially different fish species.

References 

Lakes of Sudurpashchim Province